This article contains information about the literary events and publications of 1805.

Events
January 18–September 6 – Samuel Taylor Coleridge serves as Acting Public Secretary in Malta.
Early – Jacob Grimm is invited to Paris as an assistant to Friedrich Carl von Savigny.
October 12 – The new Theatre Royal, Bath, opens in England, replacing the Old Orchard Street Theatre.
Unknown date – Henry Thomas Colebrooke makes the first translation into English of the Sanskrit Aitareya Upanishad.

New books

Fiction
Eugenia de Acton – The Nuns of the Desert
Sophie Ristaud Cottin – Mathilde (translated as The Saracen; or Matilda and Malek Adhel: A Crusade Romance)
Charlotte Dacre – Confessions of the Nun of St. Omer
Robert Charles Dallas – The Morlands
Maria Edgeworth – The Modern Griselda
Jean-Baptiste Cousin de Grainville – Le Dernier Homme
Elizabeth Helme:
The Chronicles of Christabelle de Mowbray
The Pilgrims of the Cross
William Henry Ireland – Gondez the Monk
Matthew Gregory Lewis – The Bravo of Venice
Mary Meeke – The Wonder of the Village
Anna Maria Porter
A Sailor's Friendship
A Soldier's Love
Jan Potocki – The Manuscript Found in Saragossa (Manuscrit trouvé à Saragosse, first ten "days")
Catherine Selden – Villa Nova

Children
Ann Taylor and Jane Taylor – Original Poems for Infant Minds by several young persons, vol. 2
Achim von Arnim and Clemens Brentano (edited and composed) – Des Knaben Wunderhorn, vol. 1

Drama
Marianne Chambers – The School for Friends
Alexandre-Vincent Pineux Duval – Le Menuisier de Livonie
 Robert William Elliston – The Venetian Outlaw
Matthew Lewis – Rugantino
Adam Gottlob Oehlenschläger – Hakon Jarl
 John Tobin – The Honey Moon

Poetry
Ivan Pnin – God
Walter Scott – The Lay of the Last Minstrel
Martin Archer Shee – Rhymes on Art
Robert Southey – Madoc

Non-fiction
Hosea Ballou – A Treatise on Atonement
James Belcher – "Treatice [sic.] on Boxing by Mr. J. Belcher" (article in George Barrington, New London Year)
Henry Thomas Colebrooke
Essay on the Vedas
A Grammar of the Sanskrit Language
Denis Diderot (posthumously) – Rameau's Nephew (in a German translation by Goethe)
William Henry Ireland – The Confessions of William Henry Ireland
Robert Jenkinson, 2nd Earl of Liverpool – Treatise on the Coins of the Realm
Ellis Cornelia Knight – Description of Latium or La Campagna di Roma
Richard Payne Knight – An Analytical Inquiry into the Principles of Taste
Jane Marcet (anonymously) – Conversations on Chemistry 
Mercy Otis Warren – History of the Rise, Progress, and Termination of the American Revolution

Births
February 4 – William Harrison Ainsworth, English historical novelist (died 1882)
April 2 – Hans Christian Andersen, Danish writer (died 1875)
July 29 – Alexis de Tocqueville, French writer (died 1859)
August 29 – F. D. Maurice, English theologian and novelist (died 1872)
September 19 – John Stevens Cabot Abbott, American historian (died 1877)
December 23 – Joseph Smith, American founder and prophet of the Latter Day Saint movement (killed 1844)

Deaths
February 24 – Ralph Broome, English pamphleteer (born 1742)
March 29 – Jean Elliot, Scottish poet (born 1727)
May 9 – Friedrich Schiller, German playwright (born 1759)
May 25 – William Paley, English philosopher (born 1743)
 Anna Maria Rückerschöld, Swedish author (born 1725)
June 18 – Arthur Murphy (Charles Ranger), Irish writer (born 1727)
July 27 – Brian Merriman (Brian Mac Giolla Meidhre), Irish-language poet (born c. 1749)
August 3 – Christopher Anstey, English poet (born 1724)
Early September – Mary Deverell, English religious writer, essayist and poet (born 1731)
September 3 – Johann Martin Abele, German publisher (born 1753)
December 21 – Manuel Maria Barbosa du Bocage, Portuguese poet (born 1765)
unknown dates
Ji Yun (纪昀), Chinese poet and scholar (born 1724)
Anna Hammar-Rosén, Swedish publisher (born 1735)

References

 
Years of the 19th century in literature